Roy Bakkenes (born 8 November 1990, in Amersfoort) is a Dutch footballer who plays as a midfielder for Hoofdklasse side DOVO.

Club career
He started his professional career at FC Volendam before moving abroad to Belgian side Royal Antwerp in 2013. He returned to Holland to join Hoofdklasser DOVO in summer 2014.

References

External links
 Voetbal International

1990 births
Living people
Sportspeople from Amersfoort
Association football midfielders
Dutch footballers
FC Volendam players
Royal Antwerp F.C. players
Eerste Divisie players
Dutch expatriate footballers
Expatriate footballers in Belgium
Dutch expatriate sportspeople in Belgium
VV DOVO players
Footballers from Utrecht (province)